Francis Adams Iredale (19 June 1867 – 15 April 1926) was an Australian cricketer who played 14 Test matches between 1888 and 1902.

Early life
Frank Iredale was born to Thomas Richardson and Margaret Iredale (nee Adams) on 19 June 1867 at the family home in Bourke Street, Surry Hills, Sydney. His parents were married in 1862.

First-class career
Iredale, after some good performances with bat and ball for the Albert club in the local Sydney competition, debuted at the end of 1888 for New South Wales in a match against a selection known as an Australian XI. In his only innings for the match Frank scored 13, and in the combined side's second innings, when given his first chance as a bowler, sent down 15 unsuccessful overs for 41 runs.

Iredale wasn't chosen again for more than a year, and not regularly chosen in the NSW team until the 1892-93 season. His first century in first-class cricket came at the MCG in late December 1892 during the match against Victoria, scoring 101 in about 265 minutes. A steady innings, 'Felix' in The Australasian, noted that it was "marked by ease and confidence for the most part, and his style won praise from all."

Test career
Frank Iredale debuted for Australia in an Ashes match against England in late 1894. His fine innings of 81, and contribution to a rescuing partnership with George Giffen was mentioned in reminiscence soon after his death in 1926.

Retirement and later life
After his retirement from the playing field, Iredale continued to serve the Australian cricketing community, acting as a national selector and, after 1922, as Secretary of the New South Wales Cricket Association. He was forced by a period of ill-health to resign from that position in early 1926.

He died, aged 58, just a few weeks later on 15 April.

References

External links 

1867 births
1926 deaths
Australia Test cricketers
New South Wales cricketers
Cricketers from Sydney